Shyamnagar railway station is the railway station in the town of Shyamnagar. It serves the local areas of Shyamnagar in North 24 Parganas district, West Bengal, India.

History
The Sealdah–Kusthia line of the Eastern Bengal Railway was opened to railway traffic in 1862; the Railway previously worked only on the eastern side of the Hooghly River.

Trains

One can board local and passenger trains every now and then from this station to go to Kolkata, Budge Budge, Majerhat, Katwa and so on. Not only the Sealdah–Bardhaman local (via Bandel station) but also all of the Sealdah main line local trains halt at this very station. The Maitree Express not only connecting just two cities, Kolkata and Dhaka but also two countries India and Bangladesh, passes through this railway station.

Electrification
The Sealdah–Ranaghat sector underwent electrification from 1963 to 1965.

References

External links

 

Sealdah railway division
Railway stations in North 24 Parganas district
Transport in Kolkata
Kolkata Suburban Railway stations